Young's Literal Translation (YLT) is a translation of the Bible into English, published in 1862. The translation was made by Robert Young, compiler of Young's Analytical Concordance to the Bible and Concise Critical Comments on the New Testament. Young used the Textus Receptus (TR) and the Masoretic Text (MT) as the basis for his translation. He wrote in the preface to the first edition, "It has been no part of the Translator's plan to attempt to form a New Hebrew or Greek Text—he has therefore somewhat rigidly adhered to the received ones." Young produced a "Revised Version" of his translation in 1887, but he stuck with the Received Text. He wrote in the preface to the Revised Edition, "The Greek Text followed is that generally recognized as the 'Received Text,' not because it is thought perfect, but because the department of Translation is quite distinct from that of textual criticism, and few are qualified for both. If the original text be altered by a translator, (except he give his reasons for and against each emendation,) the reader is left in uncertainty whether the translation given is to be considered as that of the old or of the new reading." A new Revised Edition was released ten years after Robert Young's death on October 14, 1888. The 1898 version was based on the TR, easily confirmed by the word "bathe" in Revelation 1:5 and the word "again" in Revelation 20:5. The "Publishers' Note to the Third Edition" explains, "The work has been subjected to a fresh revision, making no alteration on the principles on which the Translation proceeds, but endeavouring to make it as nearly perfect in point of accuracy on its present lines as possible."

Translation philosophy 
The Literal Translation is, as the name implies, a very literal translation of the original Hebrew and Greek texts. The Preface to the Second Edition states:

Therefore, Young used the present tense in many places in which other translations use the past tense, particularly in narratives. For example, the YLT version of Genesis begins as follows:

Young's Literal Translation in the 1898 edition also consistently renders the Hebrew tetragrammaton (divine name) throughout the Old Testament as "Jehovah", instead of the traditional practice of representing the tetragrammaton in English as "" in small capitals, but editions prior to 1898 do say "" in small capitals.

Assessment 

Young's translation is closer to the Hebrew than the better-known versions of this passage in English. The Revised Standard Version (RSV), which is based on Biblia Hebraica Stuttgartensia, for example, treats verses 1–3 in this way:

Young's usage of English present tense rather than past tense has been supported by scholars ranging from the medieval Jewish rabbi Rashi (who advised, "[I]f you are going to interpret [this passage] in its plain sense, interpret it thus: At the beginning of the creation of heaven and earth, when the earth was (or the earth being) unformed and void [...] God said, 'Let there be light.) to Richard Elliott Friedman in his translation of the Pentateuch in The Bible with Sources Revealed (2002).

The translation is not perfectly literal. It renders one passage as "And on the first of the Sabbaths" while it translates another as "And on the first of the week" even though the two phrases are identical in the Greek texts. To quote the preface, "Every effort has been made to secure a comparative degree of uniformity in rendering the original words and phrases. It is the Translator's ever-growing conviction, that even this smaller number may be reduced still further." David Dewey, in A User's Guide to Bible Translations, mentions that Young's "method of translating Hebrew tenses makes his Old Testament in places virtually unreadable."

Eternity or age

Another important feature of YLT is its treatment of the Hebrew word  and the Greek word . These two words have basically the same meaning, and YLT translates them and their derivatives as "age" or "age-enduring". Other English versions most often translate them to indicate eternality (eternal, everlasting, forever, etc.). Rendering  to indicate eternality in this verse would result in the contradictory phrase "end of eternity", so the question arises whether it should ever be so. Proponents of universal reconciliation point out that this has significant implications for soteriology and the problem of hell. However, "age" and "age-enduring" imply indeterminacy which may be either timeless and atemporal or pertaining to an indefinite period of time, the former (but not the latter) meaning having been acquired by the words "eternity" and "eternal".

While it has been argued that "eternity" and "eternal" also have other meanings including "endless period of time" and "endless in time" respectively, this is rarely the case in late antique texts, where the word  would be used to designate endless duration.

Compare the following passages, quoted from YLT with words corresponding to "age" or "age-enduring" emphasised:

See also 

 Geneva Bible
 Green's Literal Translation
 Julia E. Smith Parker Translation
 Literal Standard Version
 Tyndale Bible

References

External links 

 Young's Literal Translation, complete text online
Young's Literal Translation, complete text online
 Downloadable PDF of Young's Literal Translation (3rd ed.)
New Schaff-Herzog Encyclopedia of Religious Knowledge, Vol. XII: Trench – Zwingli

1862 books
19th-century Christian texts
Bible translations into English
Translation studies